The Rural Municipality of Round Valley No. 410 is a rural municipality (RM) in the Canadian province of Saskatchewan within Census Division No. 13 and  Division No. 6.

History 
The RM of Round Valley No. 410 incorporated as a rural municipality on December 13, 1909.

Geography

Communities and localities 
The following urban municipalities are surrounded by the RM.

Towns
 Unity

The following unincorporated communities are within the RM.

Localities
 Adanac (dissolved as a village)
 Buccleugh
 Poyser
 Swinburne
 Unity Station

Demographics 

Attractions 
 Unity & District Heritage Museum
 Unity & District Regional Park

Government 
The RM of Round Valley No. 410 is governed by an elected municipal council and an appointed administrator that meets on the second Tuesday of every month. The reeve of the RM is Brad Ireland while its administrator is Rhonda Brandle. The RM's office is located in Unity.

Transportation 
 Saskatchewan Highway 14
 Saskatchewan Highway 21
 Saskatchewan Highway 787
 Unity Aerodrome
 Canadian National Railway
 Canadian Pacific Railway

See also 
List of rural municipalities in Saskatchewan

References 

Round Valley

Division No. 13, Saskatchewan